I Don't Trust Men Anymore (Spanish: Yo no creo en los hombres) is a Mexican telenovela produced by Giselle González for Televisa. It is based on Yo no creo en los hombres (1991), produced in México.  Critically acclaimed, it was the most awarded novela of 2014 and is widely considered to be one of the best telenovelas of the decade.

Alejandro Camacho, Adriana Louvier and Gabriel Soto star as the protagonists, while Flavio Medina, Azela Robinson and Rosa María Bianchi star as the main antagonists.

Production of Yo no creo en los hombres officially started on July 7, 2014.

Plot 
María Dolores (Adriana Louvier) is a poor and noble girl who has a great talent for making couture dresses. When her father is killed in a robbery, she has to take the responsibility of supporting for her family. Just before the death of her father, she had quit working at the couture workshop as María Dolores was tired of the harassment she was subjected by Jacinto, her supervisor; however, María Dolores now has to reconsider returning to the shop because it depends on the future of her mother Esperanza (Macaria) and Clara (Eleane Puell), her sister.

When she decides to denounce Jacinto, she meets Maximiliano Bustamante (Gabriel Soto), an attractive and very honest lawyer who is deeply impressed by her beauty and offers to help her. Although there is no attraction between them, they both have commitments, but that changes as María Dolores and Maximiliano get to know each other.

Cast

Main cast 
Alejandro Camacho as Claudio Bustamante
Adriana Louvier as María Dolores Morales
Gabriel Soto as Maximiliano Bustamante 
Rosa María Bianchi as Úrsula de la Vega
Flavio Medina as Daniel Santibáñez de la Vega

Also main cast 
Azela Robinson as Josefa Cabrera
Luz María Jerez as Alma Mondragón de Bustamante
Cecilia Toussaint as Honoria Ramírez 
Macaria as Esperanza Garza de Morales
Adalberto Parra as Jacinto 
Juan Carlos Colombo as Fermín Delgado 
Sonia Franco as Ivana Duval
Pedro de Tavira as Julián Ramírez 
Adriana Llabrés as Jenny
Fabiola Guajardo as Isela Ramos Cabrera
Jorge Gallegos as Orlando
Lenny de la Rosa as Ari
Estefanía Villarreal as Doris Balbuena
Pablo Perroni as Gerry 
Elizabeth Guindi as  Susana
Eleane Puell as Clara Morales 
Jesús Carús as Leonardo Bustamante 
Sophie Alexander as Maleny Santibáñez de la Vega
Juan Carlos Barreto as Arango

Supporting cast 
Jesús Ochoa as Marcelo Monterrubio
Violeta Isfel as Nayeli Campos

Special participation 
Aleyda Gallardo
Ximena Ballinas
José Ángel García as Rodolfo Morales

Ratings

Awards and nominations

See also 
List of telenovelas of Televisa

References

External links 

2014 telenovelas
Mexican telenovelas
Televisa telenovelas
2014 Mexican television series debuts
Television shows set in Mexico City
2015 Mexican television series endings
Television series reboots
Spanish-language telenovelas